The America's Intelligence Wire is a daily general newswire service.  The news service is owned and published by Financial Times, Ltd, which also operates companion newswire Europe Intelligence Wire.

See also
 Business and Company Resource Center, Gale Cengage Learning, 2009

References

News agencies based in the United States